Mark Brian Wise (born November 9, 1953 in Montreal, Quebec) is a Canadian-American theoretical physicist. He has conducted research in elementary particle physics and cosmology. He is best known for his role in the development of heavy quark effective theory (HQET), a mathematical formalism that has allowed physicists to make predictions about otherwise intractable problems in the theory of the strong nuclear interactions. He has also published work on mathematical models for finance and risk assessment.

Biography
Wise was born in Montreal, Quebec, Canada. He was educated at the University of Toronto (B.S., 1976; M.S., 1977) and Stanford University (Ph.D., 1980). While still a student, he co-authored a book on mathematical methods in physics with Toronto professor Lynn Trainor. With Fred Gilman, his graduate advisor at Stanford, Wise wrote several highly influential papers on experimental predictions of the quark model. Wise was a junior fellow at the Harvard Society of Fellows from 1980 to 1983. He has been at the California Institute of Technology (Caltech) since then.

Wise is currently the John A. McCone Professor of High Energy Physics at Caltech, a fellow of the American Physical Society (2003), and a member of the American Academy of Arts and Sciences and of the National Academy of Sciences. From 1984 to 1987 he was a fellow of the Alfred P. Sloan Foundation. He shared the 2001 Sakurai Prize for Theoretical Particle Physics with Nathan Isgur and Mikhail Voloshin, "for the construction of the heavy quark mass expansion and the discovery of the heavy quark symmetry in quantum chromodynamics, which led to a quantitative theory of the decays of c and b flavored hadrons."

He has supervised over three dozen graduate students.

Wise was the science consultant for Iron Man 2.

Works 
From Physical Concept to Mathematical Structure: an Introduction to Theoretical Physics, with Lynn E.H. Trainor (1979)
Heavy Quark Physics, with Aneesh V. Manohar (2000)

References

External links 
 List of physics papers, from INSPIRE-HEP
 Sakurai Prize biography
 Website at Caltech

1953 births
Living people
Canadian physicists
21st-century American physicists
University of Toronto alumni
Stanford University alumni
Harvard Fellows
California Institute of Technology faculty
Members of the United States National Academy of Sciences
J. J. Sakurai Prize for Theoretical Particle Physics recipients
Scientists from Montreal
20th-century Canadian scientists
21st-century Canadian scientists
Fellows of the American Physical Society